Merodon equestris (Narcissus bulb fly, greater bulb fly, large bulb fly, large Narcissus fly) is a Holarctic species of hoverfly (Family Syrphidae). 
 
Like many other hoverflies it displays a colouration pattern similar to a stinging insect (a bumblebee in this case) as an evolutionary defense mechanism. Other syrphid bee mimics are Mallota, Arctophila, Criorhina, Pocota and Brachypalpus. Merodon species are distinguished from these by the very strong hind femora, which bear a large triangular projection on the underside near the tip. It flies in low vegetation while the other bumblebee mimics prefer higher vegetation layers.

Description
A stout fly with a small head. The tergites are black, without the dust spots or blue-purple sheen of other Merodon species. The thorax and abdomen are hidden by dense, long, erect hairs of variable colouration. Tibia 3 of the male has 2 spurs at the apex. The larva is described and figured by Hodson (1932)  and it is illustrated in colour by Rotheray (1993).

Distribution
In the Palearctic it is found from Fennoscandia south to Iberia and the Mediterranean basin, and Ireland east through Europe into Russia and Japan. In the Nearctic it is found from British Columbia south to California. It has been introduced to New Zealand. (see map)

Biology
Habitat: Open areas in deciduous forest up into the subalpine zone but significantly synanthropic, occurring  in suburban parks and gardens and on horticultural land. The adult flies low in April to July with a fast zig-zag flight, among ground vegetation  frequently settling on bare ground. Adult M. equestris feed on pollen and nectar. They visit a large variety of flowers for nectar, while the larvae feed internally in tissues of bulbs of Amaryllidaceae, and they are regarded as a horticultural pest, especially of Narcissus. A bibliography of the literature on the biology of M.equestris is given by Barkemeyer (1994)

Colour forms

References

External links

Eumerini
Diptera of Asia
Diptera of Europe
Diptera of North America
Hoverflies of North America
Insects described in 1794
Taxa named by Johan Christian Fabricius